Julayi is a 2012 Indian Telugu-language action comedy film written and directed by Trivikram Srinivas, and produced by S. Radha Krishna under Haarika & Hassine Creations banner. The film stars Allu Arjun, Ileana D'Cruz, Sonu Sood, and Rajendra Prasad. The soundtrack was composed by Devi Sri Prasad, with cinematography handled by Chota K. Naidu and his brother Shyam K. Naidu, and editing done by Prawin Pudi.

The film was released worldwide on 9 August 2012 to positive reviews, and was commercially successful. The film has garnered the Nandi Award for Best Popular Feature Film. It was remade into Tamil titled as Saagasam.

Plot
A master-robber named Bittu and a local MLA named Varadarajulu plan to rob  from a bank. Ravindra Narayan believes in earning quick money rather than toiling like his father Narayana Moorthy. During a chance meeting with Bittu, Ravi reveals his intention of making quick money by betting on an IPL match and discloses the location of the betting ring. However, the police raid the location, and Ravi is apprehended. During interrogation, Ravi deduces that Bittu has tipped off the cops to commit a crime and convinces ACP Raja Manikyam. Bittu successfully robs the bank, and his brother Lala takes the money to the city's dumping yard. 

However, the police catch Lala, who resists them, only to be killed by Ravi. Meanwhile, Bittu goes to the dumping yard to collect the money but is shocked as the dumping yard is burnt to ashes. Having his brother dead and the money burnt, Bittu decides to kill Ravi. Manikyam sends Ravi to Hyderabad from Visakhapatnam under the Witness Protection Program and makes him stay at his friend DIG Sitaram's house. One day, Ravi happens to see Madhu, a middle-class girl who works with travel agent Murthy, an associate of Bittu. He prepares fake passports for Bittu's gang to help them escape from India. Ravi befriends Madhu, both fall in love with each other and the two find out about Bittu. 

Bittu kills Raja Manikyam by planting a bomb in his car and also attacks Ravi's family where his father gets hospitalized but recovers, which makes him realize his mistakes and also asks him to retrieve the money for the people, who toiled day and night for their family. Ravi finds that his sister Raji is kidnapped and also framed for Raja Manikyam's murder when he unknowingly picked up a call which is a phone bomb activated in the car but is released with the help of DIG Sitaram. Ravi finds that Raja Manikyam had faked his death as Bittu learned of Raja Manikyam and Varadarajulu's plan when he learns that they exchanged the money in the dumping yard into fake currencies which were burnt by them to let Bittu think that Ravi burnt the money. 

Bittu kills Raja Manikyam and Varadarajulu and plans to escape from the country by having the money stored in a container and transporting it to a good's ship. Ravi, having deduced Bittu's plan fools the henchman and makes them return the money to the bank. The henchman gets killed by the mob, who were protesting at the bank. A showdown occurs between Ravi and Bittu where Ravi kills Bittu with Sitaram's help and also saves Raji. In the end, Ravi attends an interview and gets selected for the job, in which he earns .

Cast 

 Allu Arjun as Ravindra "Ravi" Narayan 
 Ileana D'Cruz as Madhu, Ravi's love interest
 Sonu Sood as Bittu
 Rajendra Prasad as DIG Sitaram IPS (Ravi's friend and guru) 
 Kota Srinivasa Rao as MLA Varadarajulu
 Tanikella Bharani as Narayana Murthy, Ravi's father
 Brahmanandam as Pickpocket, whom Sitaram has kept as servant              
 Ali  as Cameo Appearance
 Rao Ramesh as ACP Raja Manikyam IPS
 Brahmaji as Travel Murthy (Travel Agent) 
 Shafi as Lala, Bittu's brother
 M. S. Narayana as Sub-Inspector Valmiki
 Dharmavarapu Subramanyam as Madhu's father
 Sheetal Menon as Devayani, Bittu's love interest
 Tulasi as Kameswari
 Hema as Sujata
 Pragathi as Lalita
 Sreemukhi as Raji, Ravi's sister 
 Ravi Prakash as Dhanushkoti, Bittu's henchman 
 Pradeep Machiraju as Ravi's friend working in fm studio
 Saptagiri as Ravi's friend
 Amit Tiwari as Bittu's henchman
 Vamsi Krishna as Bittu's henchman
 Posani Krishna Murali as Club Owner
 Gautam Raju as Police Constable
 Sivannarayana as Tea Seller
 Kalpika Ganesh as Neha
 Shravan as Sattaru
 Prabhu as Prabhu
 Vennela Kishore as Customer in Cafe 
 Raghu Babu as customer in bar 
 Ananth Babu as Priest
 Dhanraj as Patient in Hospital 
 Rajitha as Ravi's neighbour 
 Sunny as Thief
 Venkata Giridhar Vajja 
 Udaya Bhanu in an item number
 Raju Sundaram (cameo appearance in a song)
 Prakash Raj (voiceover)

Production

Development 
In 2010 after his film Kaleja was released, many reports suggested that Trivikram would work with Venkatesh for his next film. It was reported that the film would start filming in early 2011. But due to unknown reasons, the project failed to take off. In March 2011, reports suggested that Trivikram had approached Allu Arjun for a film and that Arjun has accepted the offer. Also it was reported that DVV Danayya would produce the film under his Universal Media banner. DVV Danayya previously made the successful film Desamuduru with Allu Arjun. It was also reported that Ileana was cast as the female lead and the filming would begin in May 2011. Although there were several reports on when the filming would begin, all proved untrue. In August 2011, it was reported that Allu Arjun has injured his shoulder and went to Australia for surgery on Trivikram's request. This caused the project to be further delayed. In September 2011, an official statement was released by the producers stating that as Allu Arjun was in Australia for shoulder surgery, the filming would start in late October 2011. It was also announced that the film is being produced by S. Radha Krishna under his Haarika & Hassine banner and with DVV Danayya presenting it. It was also announced that Devi Sri Prasad who had previously worked with both Arjun & Trivikram would score the music. It was reported that both Allu Arjun, as well as Trivikram, had slashed their remuneration for the film in a bid to bring the production cost down. Finally, on 2 November 2011 after months of getting delayed the film was officially launched. It was announced that Ileana was cast as the female lead and the other cast and crew was also announced. On 14 November 2011 filming began in Hyderabad. Although there were many reports that the film was titled as Honey, the director dismissed the reports saying that no decision was taken. In March 2012, it was announced that the film was titled as Julai.

Casting 
It was announced in September 2011 that Rajendra Prasad was cast for a vital role in the film. It was later reported that Rajendra Prasad would be playing the role of a cop in the film. at first Trivikram wanted to cast Sudeep as a villain but due to Sudeep's busy schedule, Trivikram later cast Sonu Sood as the antagonist in the film. The other cast includes popular Telugu actors like Kota Srinivasa Rao, Brahmanandam, Tanikella Bharani, M. S. Narayana, Dharmavarapu Subramanyam, Brahmaji and Rao Ramesh. It was reported that Mahesh Babu would provide voice over for the film similar to Trivikram's Jalsa, but it proved to be untrue. It was reported that Udaya Bhanu would do an item number in the film

Filming 
After months of delay, filming began in Hyderabad on 14 November 2011. Scenes between Brahmanandam and Ileana at a hospital in Kukatpally were canned during the first schedule of filming. The second schedule of filming began on 13 December 2011. Filming took place at Ramoji Film City and Sivarla in Hyderabad. In January 2012, action scenes in shivering cold weather were canned at RFC under the supervision of Peter Hein. In February 2012, bank robbery scenes were shot on Allu Arjun and Sonu Sood in Hyderabad. Also in February 2012, more action scenes on Allu Arjun were canned at Chennai Port under Peter Hein's supervision. In March 2012, filming took place in Visakhapatnam, Andhra pradesh. On 6 April 2012, it was reported that filming of the entire talkie part has been completed and four songs are yet to be canned. On 20 April 2012 it was reported by 123Telugu that the production unit would be travelling to Dubai on 26 April 2012 to film two songs on the lead pair and the remaining two songs would be shot in India. On 9 June 2012 fire broke out in a special Irani Hotel set, that was erected for the film in Ramoji Film City. Allu Arjun and Brahmaji suffered minor injuries in this accident.

Music

The soundtrack album of the film was composed by Devi Sri Prasad. The audio of the film was released on 6 July 2012 through Aditya Music label. Lyrics for three songs were written by Srimani, two songs by Ramajogayya Sastry and one song by the music director of the film, Devi Sri Prasad. The audio launch event of the film took place at the Hitex Exhibition center in Madhapur, Hyderabad on the same day. The audio was a huge success with receiving a positive reception from critics and audience alike. Musicperk.com, a famous music site marked Julai as one of the top 10 albums in 2012 rating it 9/10.

Release

Pre-release business

It was also reported that Dasari Narayana Rao will release the film under his banner Siri Media. It was reported that it was the highest amount ever paid for an Allu Arjun starrer. It was reported in April 2012 that Ficus had acquired the overseas theatrical distribution rights of the film excluding Singapore and Malaysia.

Theatrical
The film was released worldwide on over 1600 screens on 9 August 2012. It is the biggest release of Allu Arjun's career The film has been awarded with 'U/A' certificate by the Central Board of Film Certification. Gajapokkiri, the Malayalam dubbed version of the film was released on 17 August 2012. The film was also dubbed and released in Hindi as Dangerous Khiladi in 2013.

Reception

Box office 
Julayi collected  nett at AP box office on its first day. Julayi collected  nett at AP box office on its first week. Julayi collected  nett share in rest of India and overseas on its first week. and  nett at Overseas in 8 Day extended first week.

Julayi opened very well overseas and collected more than $1 million. In USA alone, the film had collected more than $600,000 including premiere shows in its first weekend. Taran Adarsh from Bollywood Hungama reported that Julayi has collected over $569,436 (Rs. 3.15 crore) over the weekend in US with the per screen average for the film being around $12,379.

With Julai, Allu Arjun became the fourth Telugu actor whose film collected a distributor share  at the box office. The film has completed 50 days on 27 September 2012.

Julayi got Pre-release revenue's up to  making Table profits to the producer.
Julayi was released in 1,600 theaters worldwide on 9 August 2012.

Critical response
Julayi received positive reviews from critics praising the performances of Allu Arjun and Sonu Sood. Riya Chakravarty from NDTV wrote, "Overall, the movie caters to all ages. Watch the movie for its witty dialogues and energetic performances.". Sangeetha Devi Dundoo from The Hindu described the film as "high on energy and wit" and commented that "Julayi has all the staple ingredients that characterise a Telugu masala entertainer" and concluded that "brain matches brawn in this masala entertainer". Shekhar from OneIndia Entertainment in a positive review concluded, "Watch Julayi for Allu Arjun's energetic performance, Devi Sri Prasad's music, Trivikram's witty dialogues, Sonu Sood's great action, Rajendra Prasad's performance and Ileana's glamour. It is a perfect mixture of performances. The film has everything for the audience of all class and age group."

Karthik Pasupulate from The Times of India gave the film three out of five stars and commented that "The movie has enough in it for Allu Arjun fans to dig into it, the others might not find it as amusing." Pavithra Srinivasan from Rediff criticised the film and felt it to be a "no brainer which loses steam because of the glaring lack of logic" and "gaping plot-holes". She lauded Allu Arjun for "carrying the film on his capable shoulders, hurling punches (both verbal and physical), bashing up goons and going gaga for his girl." CNN-IBN declared the film as "lackluster" and noted that the film was "more amusing than intelligent". It also felt that the film is "far from being either a romance or a laugh riot."

Accolades

References

External links 
 

2012 films
2010s Telugu-language films
2012 action comedy films
2010s chase films
Indian action comedy films
Indian chase films
Telugu films remade in other languages
Films about witness protection
Films directed by Trivikram Srinivas
Films scored by Devi Sri Prasad
2012 masala films
Sign-language films
Films shot in Visakhapatnam
2012 comedy films